is an anime OVA, and was released on VHS and DVD in North America by ADV Films. The OVA was animated by Daume and was produced by Marcus Company.

Synopsis 
Five wealthy girls, each with a special talent, have been targeted for assassination by a mysterious person. While enrolling in the Seika School for Girls, a group of mercenaries have begun their attack on the girls. Kimiko Ayanokouji, her twin sister Miyuki and their friends, Youko, Reika and Nina must find a way to survive, fight back against the bad guys and get to the bottom of who wants them dead.

Main Characters
 
voiced by Shiho Niiyama (Japanese), Dara Aylor English
Kimiko is the leader of the Debutante Detective Corps. She's very aloof, considers herself beautiful and has an IQ of 200. Kimiko's special talent is ESP, of which Miyuki claims is made up.
 
voiced by Yūko Nagashima (Japanese), Shana McClendon (English)
Miyuki is Kimiko's younger twin sister. Unlike Kimiko, Miyuki is easily tempered, especially by Kimiko's antics. Her specialty is mechanics and electronics and is an expert hacker.
 
voiced by Natsumi Yanase (Japanese), Missy Atwood (English)
Youko is a glasses girl who rides around in a limousine. Her unique talent is to disguise herself into anyone regardless of age, gender or nationality. In addition, she can mimic anyone's voice by memory.
 
voiced by Sakura Tange (Japanese), Larissa Wolcott (English)
Reika is born in Hong Kong from a wealthy merchant family. Her training with the Triads has developed her martial arts talent, and thus becoming the Debutantes' personal muscle.
 
voiced by Rumi Kasahara (Japanese), Lindsay Doleshal (English)
Nina is born in New York City, but is of a legendary Russian bloodline. She loves everything about the military and is a talented marksman with any gun.

Supporting characters
 
voiced by Yukikasa Kishino (Japanese), David Kroll
He runs the Seika School for Girls and gets word of the assassination attempt of the Debutante Detective Corps from the police.
 
voiced by Takeshi Aono (Japanese), Michael Dalmon (English)
Daichi is the Assistant Inspector assigned by the Commissioner to protect the Debutante Detective Corps ever since the video threat was released. He's a balding husky old man who takes his business seriously.
 
voiced by Tōru Furuya (Japanese), Joseph Anthony (English)
Nomura is Daichi's assistant in the criminal case regarding the Debutante Detective Corps. He's a man in glasses and very shy and nervous when it comes to girls, more specifically Kimiko, who loves to flirt with him.
 
voiced by Charles Campbell (English)
He assigned Daichi and Nomura to protect the Debutante Detective Corps from those that threatened them.

Antagonists
 
voiced by Kazuya Ichijō (Japanese), Gary Dehan (English)
He and two other men were discharged soldiers who became mercenaries for hire. Kartz and his men were imprisoned for their crimes, but somehow managed to escape. Once out, he received orders to kill the Debutante Detective Corps by any means necessary.
 
voiced by Shin-ichiro Miki (Japanese), Joseph Anthony (English)
Molicov is the expert sniper and marksman in Kartz's unit.
 
voiced by Hisao Egawa (Japanese), Lowell B. Bartholomee (English)
Martin is a giant African-American soldier in Kartz's unit and is extremely skilled in hand-to-hand combat.

Others
 
voiced by Chizu Yonemoto (Japanese), Nicole Cavazos (English)
She is the reporter who breaks the news about Col. Kartz's unit's prison breakout, as well as the theft of a military jump jet, of which Kartz used against the Debutantes.
 
voiced by Heimlick Studermeyer (English)
 
voiced by Nicole Cavazos (English)
 
voiced by Lowell B. Bartholomee (English)
 
voiced by Rebecca L. Cannon (English)

Music 
Both the insert theme  and ending theme  were performed by Virgo.

External links 
 

1996 anime OVAs
Action anime and manga
ADV Films